The Harpadontinae are a subfamily of lizardfishes in the family Synodontidae.

It comprises two genera:
Harpadon
Saurida

References
Subfamily Harpadontinae - Australian Faunal Directory

Synodontidae